Jules Léotard (1 August 183816 August 1870) was a French acrobatic performer and aerialist who developed the art of trapeze. He also created and popularized the one-piece gym wear that now bears his name and inspired the 1867 song "The Daring Young Man on the Flying Trapeze", sung by George Leybourne.

Biography
Léotard was born in Toulouse, France, the son of a gymnastics instructor who ran a swimming pool in Toulouse. Léotard would practice his routines over the pool. He went on to study law.

After he passed his law exams, he seemed destined to join the legal profession. But at 18 he began to experiment with trapeze bars, ropes and rings suspended over a swimming pool. Léotard later joined the Cirque Napoléon.

On 12 November 1859, the first flying trapeze routine was performed by Jules Léotard on three trapeze bars at the Cirque Napoleon.

The costume he invented was a one-piece knitted garment streamlined to suit the safety and agility concerns of trapeze performance. It also showed off his physique, impressed spectators, and took on his name.

In 1861 he performed in London at the Alhambra music hall. His approach did not stress the risk he took, but emphasized the "ease and grace" of his trapeze work, inspiring not fear but wonder.

Léotard has inspired the 1867 song The Daring Young Man on the Flying Trapeze, made popular by George Leybourne.

He was also one of the cycling pioneers in France right before his death at age 32.

According to notes from the Victoria and Albert Museum, Jules Léotard died in 1870 from an infectious disease (possibly smallpox).

References

External links

Acrobats
Entertainers from Toulouse
1838 births
1870 deaths
Music hall performers
Infectious disease deaths in France
Deaths from smallpox